Bobsleigh at the 2012 Winter Youth Olympics took place at the Olympic Sliding Centre Innsbruck in Igls, Innsbruck, Austria on 16 January. The competition had a 2 boys' and a 2 girls' events, with the 4 boys' competition being excluded.

Medal summary

Medal table

Events

Qualification System

Boys'
The FIBT did not release a final list of qualified teams, this is just a list of teams in alphabetical order according to qualification system.

Girls'
The FIBT did not release a final list of qualified teams, this is just a list of teams in alphabetical order according to qualification system.

Qualification summary

References

 
2012
2012 in bobsleigh
2012 Winter Youth Olympics events
Youth Olympics